The Director of Public Prosecutions is the head prosecutor of Belize, whose role is to prosecute criminal offences..

Legal basis
The office of DPP is established in Article 108 of the Constitution of Belize; candidates for the position must have the same qualifications as Justices of the Supreme Court. The DPP is appointed by the Governor-General on the advice of the Judicial and Legal Services Section of the Public Services Commission, with the concurrence of the Prime Minister after consultation with the Leader of the Opposition. Though the DPP is formally part of the PSC, under Article 106(6) the PSC does not have the power to  remove the DPP. Instead, under 108(6) through (8), the PM must refer the question of removal to the Governor-General, who requests the Belize Advisory Council to investigate whether the DPP is unable to discharge his duties of office or whether his misbehaviour rises to the level of requiring his removal from office.

List of Directors of Public Prosecutions

Albert Staine, 1969
Michael Long, 1980 to 1981
George Singh
Troadio Gonzalez, 1991 to 1992
Lutchman Sooknandan (first), 1992 to 1994
Rory Field, 2000 to 2002
Kirk Anderson, 2002 to 2006
Lutchman Sooknandan (second), 2007 to 2008
Cheryl-Lynn Vidal; 2008 to 2010 (acting), 2010 to present

References